Ruta de la Amistad (English: Friendship Route) is a sculpture corridor in Mexico City located along the southern section of the Anillo Periférico highway. The route was inaugurated in 1968 as part of that year Summer Olympics, has a length of 17 kilometers and nineteen sculptures (also called stations) by artists from seventeen countries.

There are also three guest sculptures that are not located on the main route, but in three main venues of the Summer Olympics: Sol Rojo by American Alexander Calder in the Estadio Azteca, Hombre Corriendo by Mexican Germán Cueto in the Olympic Stadium and Osa Mayor by Mathias Goeritz in the Palacio de los Deportes.

History
Ruta de la Amistad was conceived by Mexican painter and sculptor Mathias Goeritz in 1967 as a public art project part of the 1968 Cultural Olympiad. The project was approved by architect Pedro Ramírez Vázquez, President of the Organising Committee of the Games of the XIX Olympiad in Mexico City. Construction happened in 1968 between 17 June and 1 August with the participation of 22 sculptors from seventeen countries.

After the 1968 Olympics the route was partially abandoned and subjected to vandalism. Some sculptures were removed from its original locations due to urban growth and infrastructure works, such as the enlargement of the Anillo Periférico highway. Patronato Ruta de la Amistad, a privately funded organization aimed to protect the route, was established in 1994 and has since helped to maintain and restore the sculptures.

List of sculptures

Located on the route

Located outside the route

References

1968 Summer Olympics
Landmarks in Mexico City